Ligonier may refer to:

People 
 Ligonier (surname)
 Earl Ligonier, a title in the Peerage of Great Britain

Places in the United States 
 Ligonier, Indiana
 Ligonier, Pennsylvania
 Ligonier Township, Pennsylvania
 Fort Ligonier, a British fortification from the French and Indian War in Ligonier, Pennsylvania

Other 
 Ligonier Ministries, an international Christian discipleship organization founded by R. C. Sproul